The Torres de Hércules are office buildings in Polígono Industrial Las Marismas, Los Barrios in Province of Cádiz. These towers were the tallest in Andalusia until Cajasol Tower was completed in Seville in 2015.

Description
The towers are inspired by the Pillars of Hercules  which were the two mountains on either side of the sea which signified that no one could go beyond the Straits of Gibraltar as the Atlantic Ocean started and this was uncharted. The two 20 storey towers are linked together by a glass hallway.

References

2009 establishments in Spain
Office buildings completed in 2009
Los Barrios
Buildings and structures in the Province of Cádiz
Pillars of Hercules
Office buildings in Spain